Kaçandoll (in Albanian) or Kačandol (in Serbian; Качандол)
is a village in the municipality of Mitrovica in the District of Mitrovica, Kosovo. According to the 2011 census, it had 119 inhabitants, all of whom were Albanian.

Geography
Like Bajgora, located to the west of Kačandol, it is in the south of the Kopaonik range and surrounded by steep mountains. Close to the village on its east side flows a tributary of the Lab river. From Kačandol the whole Lab region can be seen.

History
The village was inhabited by ethnic Albanians, of the Shala tribe, which had settled here in the mid–18th century from the Shala region in northern Albania.

Albanian rebels (kachaks), active in 1918–24, were disarmed by the Yugoslav government, which included rebels from the village, at the time part of the Vučitrn srez (municipality).

Prior to 1978, it was also known as Kačan dol (Качан дол). It was then spelled Kačandol.

According to the 1991 census, the village had no inhabitants.

Notes

References 

Kopaonik
Villages in Mitrovica, Kosovo